Egil "Bop" Johansen (11 January 1934 – 4 December 1998) was a Norwegian-Swedish jazz drummer, teacher, composer, and arranger.

Life 
Johansen was born in Oslo. He was considered already in his teens as one of the best drummers and was a professional musician from the age of 16. He received the nickname "Bop" because he was especially good at playing bebop. He was always open to the new styles of jazz that he encountered. His professional career started in Einar Stenberg’s orchestra in the summer of 1950 with Svalerødkilens badhotell and continued in the autumn with Svaes Danseskole, after which he joined Egil Monn-Iversen’s orchestra and Kjell Johansen’s experimental band for 1951-1953. He played in Rowland Greenberg’s orchestra in 1952.

He moved to Sweden in 1954 at the invitation of Simon Brehm. He entered immediately into collaboration with the Swedish jazz elite of Arne Domnérus, Bengt Hallberg, Rune Gustafsson, Georg Riedel, Jan Johansson and others, among others in Radiojazzgrupen. In 1957 he took part in the Rune Öfwerman Trio in a classic recording with the clarinetist Tony Scott in Swinging in Sweden.

Under the leadership of Harry Arnold Johansen collaborated in several classic recordings with world stars like Quincy Jones, for example on 1958's Quincy's home again. During the 1960s, Egil Johansen was a heavily touring musician foremost with the Arne Domnérus Orchestra and participating also among other things together with Alice Babs, in a commission for Swedish UN troops entertainment detail in Gaza and later on Cyprus. He was also from 1973-1983 the initiator of and responsible for the cooperative Jazz Incorporated. Johansen played on Jazz at the Pawnshop in 1977.

He was without hesitation one of the most significant jazz musicians in postwar Sweden. He played also from 1985 to 1998 with the Norwegian group Brazz Brothers and with them played over 1,200 concerts.

In 1993 he was awarded the prestigious "Buddy Prize," the highest honor a jazz musician can receive in Norway.

He performed also as a singer, among others in Hasse & Tage's revue Spader madame, where he sang the very funny  "En sång som handlar om sig själv" (“A song about itself”).

Johansen was a devoted sailor and tennis player. He was the father of the singer Jan Johansen.

Honors 
1993: Buddyprisen

Discography 
 Nana - Soundtrack (1970)
With Benny Golson
Stockholm Sojourn (Prestige, 1974)
With Quincy Jones
Quincy's Home Again (Metronome, 1958) - also released as Harry Arnold + Big Band + Quincy Jones = Jazz! (EmArcy)
With Lee Konitz
Glad, Koonix! (Dragon, 1983 [1986])
With Herbie Mann
Mann in the Morning (Prestige, 1956 [1958])
With Jimmy Witherspoon
Some of My Best Friends Are the Blues (Prestige, 1964)

Selected filmography
 The Dance Hall (1955)

References

External links
Buddy Prize

Sources 
Myggans nöjeslexikon
Nationalencyklopedin

''This article is based on a translation of the corresponding article on the Swedish Wikipedia.

1934 births
1998 deaths
20th-century Norwegian drummers
Norwegian jazz drummers
Male drummers
Norwegian jazz composers
Male jazz composers
Swedish jazz drummers
Gemini Records artists
20th-century drummers
20th-century Swedish male musicians
20th-century Swedish musicians
Radiojazzgruppen members
The Brazz Brothers members
20th-century jazz composers